"When Flanders Failed" is the third episode of the third season of the American animated television series The Simpsons. It originally aired on the Fox network in the United States on October 3, 1991. In the episode, Homer makes a wish for Ned Flanders's new left-handed store to go out of business. The wish comes true and soon the Flanders family is in financial trouble. When he discovers that Ned's house is about to be repossessed, Homer feels guilty. He helps the store flourish by telling all of Springfield's left-handed citizens to patronize it. Meanwhile, Bart takes karate lessons but quits after learning it is not as interesting as he had hoped.

The episode was written by Jon Vitti and directed by Jim Reardon. It had an unusual amount of animation glitches because the animation studio was training a new group of animators. The episode features cultural references to playwright William Shakespeare and the film It's a Wonderful Life. The title of the episode is a reference to the title of the poem "In Flanders Fields".

Since airing, the episode has received mostly positive reviews from television critics. It acquired a Nielsen rating of 13.9, and was the highest-rated show on Fox the week it aired.

Plot
Ned Flanders invites the Simpson family to a barbecue where he announces plans to quit the pharmaceutical business and open the Leftorium, a store for left-handed people. While pulling a wishbone with Ned, Homer—jealous of Ned's material success—wishes for the Leftorium to fail and go out of business. Undeterred after Lisa scolds him for indulging in schadenfreude, Homer gloats when Ned tells him business is slow. Homer sees left-handed citizens struggling with items made for right-handed people and considers telling them about the Leftorium, but decides not to.

Eventually the store closes, plunging the Flanders family into debt and misery. Ned is forced to sell his possessions, and Homer gleefully buys many of them for a pittance. Overcome by regret, Homer decides to return Ned's possessions, but he finds Ned's house repossessed and the family living in their car. Homer tells Ned to open the store one final time and informs all the left-handed residents of Springfield about the Leftorium; they descend upon the store and buy almost everything. The business boom helps Ned keep the store open and get his house back.

In the subplot, Bart begins taking karate lessons at Akira's karate school. He soon finds himself bored with karate, so he decides to skip each lesson and play video games at the mall arcade instead. Whenever Bart is asked by his friends and family about the karate techniques he is learning, he refers to the Touch of Death, an ability he sees in one of the arcade games he plays. He proceeds to terrorize Lisa into doing his will by threatening her with the Touch of Death.

When the school bullies take Lisa's saxophone, she tells them Bart will defend her with the Touch of Death. Unable to actually defend himself or his sister, Bart is pantsed and hung by his underwear from a playground basketball hoop rim by the bullies. Having reclaimed her saxophone, Lisa wistfully notes that sometimes two wrongs do make a right.

Production

The episode was written by Jon Vitti and directed by Jim Reardon. It featured an unusual number of animation glitches because the animation studio in Korea was training a new group of animators, and this episode was one of their first efforts. Show runner Mike Reiss said he will always remember it as the episode "that came back animated with a thousand mistakes in it and was just a complete and utter mess". Reardon said there was "literally a mistake in every other scene" when the episode came back from Korea. Several scenes had to be re-animated in the United States because of these glitches, but according to Reardon, "you can still see the lesser ones that got through, such as line quality problems particularly in the first act." Though it aired in season three, "When Flanders Failed" was produced during the previous season. It was recorded in spring 1991 when the previous season had ended, and was scheduled to air in autumn. The staff therefore had more time to fix the glitches during the summer. Unlike the season premiere "Stark Raving Dad", which was originally the final episode in the season two production run, this episode was not presented in Dolby Surround and uses the season two Danny Elfman arrangement of the opening and closing themes rather than the Alf Clausen arrangement.

"When Flanders Failed" features the second appearance of the character Akira, voiced by Hank Azaria. He was previously seen in the season two episode "One Fish, Two Fish, Blowfish, Blue Fish", where he is a waiter at a Japanese restaurant and was originally voiced by George Takei. It is revealed in this episode that the characters Ned Flanders, Moe Szyslak and Montgomery Burns are left-handed, just like The Simpsons creator Matt Groening. The Simpsons writer George Meyer came up with the idea of The Leftorium when the creators were trying to figure out what Ned's failed business would be. The inspiration came from a family friend of the Meyer family who had opened a left-handed store that was quickly forced to close down due to lack of business. It is also the first episode in the series to only focus on Ned Flanders.

Cultural references
The title of the episode is a reference to the title of the poem "In Flanders Fields". Homer watches the Canadian Football League Draft on television. The Simpsons writers Jay Kogen, Wallace Wolodarsky, and John Swartzwelder appear on the draft list. Akira's school is located in the mall next to Shakespeare's Fried Chicken, a reference to the English poet and playwright William Shakespeare. Akira gives Bart's karate class the ancient Chinese military treatise The Art of War by Sun Tzu. Richard Sakai is seen in one of the crowd shots at The Leftorium at the end of the episode. The ending scene is a parody of the 1946 film It's a Wonderful Life.

Reception
In its original American broadcast, "When Flanders Failed" finished 29th in the ratings for the week of September 30 – October 6, 1991, with a Nielsen rating of 13.9, equivalent to approximately 12.8 million viewing households. It was the highest-rated show on Fox that week.

Since airing, the episode has received mostly positive reviews from television critics. Kirk Baird of the Las Vegas Sun named it the fifth best episode of The Simpsons, and Central Michigan Life called it an "instant classic". Pete Oliva of North Texas Daily said the episode "proves that it is possible to laugh and cry at the same time without being able to control either response". Bill Gibron of DVD Verdict said "When Flanders Failed" shows that even if The Simpsons is not dealing with famous celebrities or "high profile places", the writers can still "wring uproarious comedy out of their cast of regulars. Flanders is a special creation in the canon of humor, a regular guy who is funny because of how hyper-normal he is compared to his Neanderthal neighbors. The focus on people who are left-handed, and the whole idea of being a lefty, is an unusual basis for a television show. But then again, nothing about The Simpsons is ever common."

Hock Guan Teh of DVD Town also praised the writers, saying they "are able to craft a downtrodden tale for the perpetually clueless Flanders family that serves to illustrate how dark emotions can eventually be overcome by Homer's guilt. A memorable episode." Niel Harvey of The Roanoke Times called "When Flanders Failed" a "classic bit of Simpsonia". The episode's reference to It's a Wonderful Life  was named the 26th greatest film reference in the history of the show by Total Film's Nathan Ditum. The side story with Bart stems from the era of the series when Bart was the big star, but it still has some funny bits."

DVD Movie Guide's Colin Jacobson wrote: "Mean Homer equals Funny Homer, so 'When Flanders Failed' presents an above average show. He seems unusually crude here, which makes him amusing. The subplot with Bart and his karate class also adds good material, especially when he threatens to turn the 'Touch of Death' on Lisa. Another sappy finish slightly mars this one, but it remains generally solid." Kimberly Potts of AOL named it tenth best episode of the show and commented: "Schadenfreude is the theme of this tight episode about Homer's joy at the failure of Flanders' Leftorium store. There are few times Homer is more shamelessly smug than he was while imitating Flanders and using Ned's yard sale grill, and we haven't even mentioned Bart's 'Touch of Death' subplot." Winston-Salem Journal's Tim Clodfelter called it an "outstanding" episode.

References

External links

 
 

The Simpsons (season 3) episodes
1991 American television episodes
Handedness

it:Episodi de I Simpson (terza stagione)#Quando Flanders fallì